William Alfred Porter (born 1884) was an English footballer who played in the Football League for Chelsea.

References

1884 births
Date of death unknown
English footballers
English Football League players
Southern Football League players
London Caledonians F.C. players
Fulham F.C. players
Chelsea F.C. players
Luton Town F.C. players
Ilford F.C. players
Association football forwards